This is a list of singles that have peaked in the Top 10 of the Billboard Hot 100 during 1970.

The Jackson 5 and Creedence Clearwater Revival each had four top-ten hits in 1970, tying them for the most top-ten hits during the year.

Top-ten singles

† — "Let It Be" also made its Hot 100 debut on March 21.

1969 peaks

1971 peaks

See also
 1970 in music
 List of Hot 100 number-one singles of 1970 (U.S.)
 Billboard Year-End Hot 100 singles of 1970

References

General sources

Joel Whitburn Presents the Billboard Hot 100 Charts: The Sixties
Joel Whitburn Presents the Billboard Hot 100 Charts: The Seventies
Additional information obtained can be verified within Billboard's online archive services and print editions of the magazine.

1970
United States Hot 100 Top 10